The 2014 Northern Mariana Islands gubernatorial election was held on November 4, 2014, to elect the Governor and Lieutenant Governor of the Northern Mariana Islands. As no candidate received a majority of the vote, a run-off election was held 14 days later. Incumbent Republican Governor Eloy Songao Inos and running mate Ralph DLG. Torres were elected. Inos, who served as lieutenant governor from 2009 to 2013, first became Governor following the resignation of his predecessor, Benigno Fitial.

Background
The previous gubernatorial election was held in 2009 for a 5-year term, in order to move all elections to even numbered years. Covenant Party candidate Benigno Fitial won re-election. His running mate, Eloy Inos, was elected to his first full term as lieutenant governor. Fitial resigned as governor in February 2013 in the face of impeachment hearings. Inos thus succeeded him governor. In September 2013, Inos, then a member of the Covenant Party, took steps to merge the Covenant Party with the territorial Republican Party, and ran for re-election as a Republican.

Candidates
Juan Babauta, former Governor (2002–2006), running as an independent
Running mate: Juan Torres, former senator
Edward "Tofila" Masga Deleon Guerrero, former Ports Authority executive director, running as a Democrat
Running mate: Danny Quitugua, former representative
Heinz Sablan Hofschneider, 2009 candidate and Speaker of the House, running as an independent
Running mate: Ray Naraja Yumul, senator (I-Saipan)
Eloy Songao Inos, incumbent governor, running as a Republican
Running mate: Senate President Ralph DLG. Torres (R-Saipan)

Results

|- style="background:#E9E9E9;text-align:center;"
! colspan="2" rowspan="2" style="text-align:left;" | Candidate 
! rowspan="2" style="text-align:left;" | Running mate
! rowspan="2" style="text-align:left;" | Party
! colspan="2" | First round
! colspan="2" | Second round
|- style="background:#E9E9E9;text-align:center;"
! width="60" | Votes
! width="30" | %
! width="65" | Votes
! width="30" | %
|-
| style="background:" |
| style="text-align:left;" | Eloy Songao Inos
| style="text-align:left;" | Ralph Deleon Guerrero Torres
| style="text-align:left;" | Republican
| 
| %
| 
| %
|-
| style="background:" |
| style="text-align:left;" | Heinz Sablan Hofschneider
| style="text-align:left;" | Ray Naraja Yumul
| style="text-align:left;" | Independent
| 
| %
| 
| %
|-
| style="background:" |
| style="text-align:left;" | Juan Nekai Babauta
| style="text-align:left;" | Juan Sablan Torres
| style="text-align:left;" | Independent
| 
| %
| colspan="2" rowspan="2" style="background:#E9E9E9" | 
|-
| style="background:" |
| style="text-align:left;" | Edward Masga Deleon Guerrero
| style="text-align:left;" | Daniel Ogo Quitugua
| style="text-align:left;" | Democratic
| 
| %
|-
| colspan="8" style="background:#E9E9E9" |
|-
! colspan="4" style="text-align:left;" | Total
! 
! 100%
! 
! 100%
|-
| colspan="8" style="background:#E9E9E9" | 
|-
| colspan="8" style="text-align:left;" | Source: Commonwealth Election Commission

References

Northern Mariana Islands
Gubernatorial
Gubernatorial